Riding Through Nevada is a 1942 American Western film directed by William Berke and written by Gerald Geraghty. The film stars Charles Starrett, Shirley Patterson, Arthur Hunnicutt, Jimmie Davis, Clancy Cooper and Davison Clark. The film was released on November 2, 1942, by Columbia Pictures.

Plot

Cast          
Charles Starrett as Steve Lowrey
Shirley Patterson as Gail Holloway
Arthur Hunnicutt as Arkansas 
Jimmie Davis as Jimmie Davis
Clancy Cooper as Ed Kendall
Davison Clark as Bob Holloway
Minerva Urecal as Widow Humbolt
Edmund Cobb as Sheriff
Ethan Laidlaw as Woods
Art Mix as Burgess
Stanley Brown as Hotel Clerk

References

External links
 

1942 films
1940s English-language films
American Western (genre) films
1942 Western (genre) films
Columbia Pictures films
Films directed by William A. Berke
American black-and-white films
1940s American films